Jason Valentine St Juste (born 21 September 1985 in Leeds) is a Kittitian footballer who plays for Ossett Town. He previously played in the Football League for Darlington.

Playing career

St Juste started his career under the guidance of Simon Clifford at Garforth Town. He became a graduate of the Leeds Brazilian Soccer School's program and was spotted by Football League Two side Darlington, joining them early in the 2004–05 season.

He made his Darlington debut in November 2004, playing as a substitute for Adrian Webster in the 2–0 win away to Cheltenham Town. He made his second appearance for Darlington on 3 January 2005 as he played the full 90 minutes and helped the team to a 3–1 win over Macclesfield Town.

On 19 March 2005 St Juste made his seventh appearance for Darlington in an away match against Grimsby Town, scoring his first goal for the club. St Juste hit headlines by scooping a hat-trick of awards. He walked away with the young player of the season and both goal of the season awards for his goals against Grimsby Town and Bristol Rovers.

He was out of contract at the end of the 2004–05 season and was linked with Southampton who initially insisted that they did not want to sign him. However, he eventually signed for Southampton on a short-term contract in September 2005 following Simon Clifford's appointment as a coach at the club.

He failed to appear for Southampton and rejoined Garforth Town in November 2006. He left Garforth to join Sandnes Ulf in 2009.

In February 2011 St Juste signed on loan for non-league 'phoenix club' Chester F.C. until the end of the season but his loan was cancelled at the end of March after he failed to make an impact whilst on loan.

He later joined F.C. Halifax Town in September 2011. Despite coming on from the bench in most games, Jason was able to score in two games for the Shaymen, at home to Blyth Spartans and away at Corby Town. In the 2012–13 season, St Juste started more games due to a groin injury to Scott McManus, but this meant playing in an unfamiliar left back position. St Juste had a very strong start to the season, including a goal against Chelmsford City in the FA Trophy Third Round, but a hernia meant that he would spend a month on the sidelines.

He joined Bradford Park Avenue A.F.C. on 5 September 2015.

In summer 2016 he joined Boston United. In summer 2017, he joined FC United of Manchester.

In September 2017 he moved to Trafford on dual registration terms.

International career
In August 2014, St Juste was called up to represent Saint Kitts and Nevis for the first time during 2014 Caribbean Cup qualification.

Honours
North Ferriby United
FA Trophy: 2014–15

References

External links
Farsley Profile

1985 births
Living people
Footballers from Leeds
Saint Kitts and Nevis footballers
Saint Kitts and Nevis international footballers
English footballers
English sportspeople of Saint Kitts and Nevis descent
Association football midfielders
Garforth Town A.F.C. players
Darlington F.C. players
Sandnes Ulf players
Chester F.C. players
FC Halifax Town players
Bradford (Park Avenue) A.F.C. players
Whitehawk F.C. players
Farsley Celtic F.C. players
North Ferriby United A.F.C. players
AFC Fylde players
English Football League players
Expatriate footballers in Norway
Southampton F.C. players
Boston United F.C. players
F.C. United of Manchester players
Trafford F.C. players